Finnie is a rural locality in the Toowoomba Region, Queensland, Australia. In the  Finnie had a population of 94 people.

Geography

Toowoomba–Karara Road forms the western boundary, and Drayton Connection Road (which links Drayton on the Gore Highway to the New England Highway) passes through the locality from north to south.

History 
A railway station in the area, on the Southern railway line, was named Finnie on 29 April 1915 after a studmaster. The station closed on 2 August 1989.

In the  Finnie had a population of 94 people.

References

Suburbs of Toowoomba
Localities in Queensland